Lily Bay is a bay on Moosehead Lake, the largest lake in the state of Maine, United States. 

Lily Bay was named for the wild lilies near its shores.

Lily Bay State Park, a 924 acres (374 ha) public recreation area, is located on the shores of Lily Bay.

References

Bodies of water of Piscataquis County, Maine
Bays of Maine